The Faber Book of Twentieth-Century Women's Poetry is a poetry anthology edited by Fleur Adcock and published in 1987 by Faber and Faber. The introduction to the selection of women poets writing in English argues that there is "no particular tradition" to distinguish them from men.

Poets in the Faber Book of Twentieth Century Women's Poetry
Fleur Adcock – Margaret Atwood – Margaret Avison – Elizabeth Bartlett – Patricia Beer – Frances Bellerby – Connie Bensley – Mary Ursula Bethell – Elizabeth Bishop – Louise Bogan – Eavan Boland – Gwendolyn Brooks – Eiléan Ni Chuilleanáin – Amy Clampitt – Gillian Clarke – Jane Cooper – Wendy Cope – Frances Cornford – Elizabeth Daryush – Rosemary Dobson – Freda Downie – Lauris Edmond – U. A. Fanthorpe – Elaine Feinstein – Tess Gallagher – Louise Glück – Barbara Guest – H. D. – Gwen Harwood – Selima Hill – Molly Holden – Robin Hyde – Elizabeth Jennings – June Jordan – Jenny Joseph – Maxine Kumin – Denise Levertov – Gwendolyn MacEwen – Sandra McPherson – Charlotte Mew – Josephine Miles – Edna St. Vincent Millay – Elma Mitchell – Marianne Moore – Lorine Niedecker – P. K. Page – Ruth Pitter – Sylvia Plath – Adrienne Rich – Judith Rodriguez – Muriel Rukeyser – Carol Rumens – E. J. Scovell – Edith Sitwell – Stevie Smith – Anne Stevenson – May Swenson – Anne Szumigalski – Jean Valentine – Ellen Bryant Voigt – Sylvia Townsend Warner – Anna Wickham – Judith Wright – Elinor Wylie

1987 poetry books
1987 anthologies
British poetry anthologies
Literature by women
Faber and Faber books